The Pegram Plantation House, perhaps also known as Peagram Plantation House, is located in Lecompte, Louisiana, and was built around 1850.  It was added to the National Register of Historic Places on October 24, 2003.

It is a one-story Greek Revival-style galleried house.

References

Houses on the National Register of Historic Places in Louisiana
Houses completed in 1850
Houses in Rapides Parish, Louisiana
National Register of Historic Places in Rapides Parish, Louisiana